Fowl are birds belonging to one of two biological orders, namely the gamefowl or landfowl (Galliformes) and the waterfowl (Anseriformes). Anatomical and molecular similarities suggest these two groups are close evolutionary relatives; together, they form the fowl clade which is scientifically known as Galloanserae (initially termed Galloanseri) (Latin gallus (“rooster”) + ānser (“goose”)). This clade is also supported by morphological and DNA sequence data as well as retrotransposon presence/absence data.

Terminology
As opposed to "fowl", "poultry" is a term for any kind of domesticated bird or bird captive-raised for meat, eggs, or feathers; ostriches, for example, are sometimes kept as poultry, but are neither gamefowl nor waterfowl. In colloquial speech, however, the term "fowl" is often used near-synonymously with "poultry," and many languages do not distinguish between "poultry" and "fowl". Nonetheless, the fact that the Galliformes and Anseriformes most likely form a monophyletic group makes a distinction between "fowl" and "poultry" warranted.

The historic difference is due to the Germanic/Latin split word pairs characteristic of Middle English; the word 'fowl' is of Germanic origin (cf. Old English "fugol", West Frisian fûgel, Dutch vogel, German Vogel, Swedish fågel, Danish/Norwegian fugl), whilst 'poultry' is of Latin via Norman French origin; the presence of an initial /p/ in poultry and an initial /f/ in fowl is due to Grimm's Law. 

Many birds that are eaten by humans are fowl, including poultry such as chickens or turkeys, game birds such as pheasants or partridges, other wildfowl like guineafowl or peafowl, and waterfowl such as ducks or geese.

Characteristics
While they are quite diverse ecologically and consequently, in an adaptation to their different lifestyles, also morphologically and ethologically, some features still unite water- and landfowl. Many of these, however, are plesiomorphic for Neornithes as a whole, and are also shared with paleognaths.
Galloanserae are very prolific; they regularly produce clutches of more than five or even more than 10 eggs, which is a lot for such sizeable birds. By comparison, birds of prey and pigeons rarely lay more than two eggs.
While most living birds are monogamous, at least for a breeding season, many Galloanserae are notoriously polygynous or polyandrous. To ornithologists, this is particularly well known in dabbling ducks, where the males band together occasionally to "gang rape" unwilling females. The general public is probably most familiar with the polygynous habits of domestic chickens, where usually one or two roosters are kept with a whole flock of females.
Hybridization is extremely frequent in the Galloanserae, and genera, not usually known to produce viable hybrids in birds, can be brought to interbreed with comparative ease. Guineafowl have successfully produced hybrids with domestic fowl and Indian peafowl, to which they are not particularly closely related as Galliformes go. This is an important factor complicating mtDNA sequence-based research on their relationships. The mallards of North America, for example, are apparently mostly derived from some males which arrived from Siberia, settled down, and mated with American black duck ancestors. See also Gamebird hybrids.
Galloanserae young are remarkably precocious. Anseriform young are able to swim and dive a few hours after hatching, and the hatchlings of mound-builders are fully feathered and even able to fly for prolonged distances as soon as they emerge from the nest mound.

Systematics and evolution
From the limited fossils that have to date been recovered, the conclusion that the Galloanserae were already widespread—the predominant group of modern birds—by the end of the Cretaceous is generally accepted nowadays. Fossils such as Vegavis indicate that essentially modern waterfowl, albeit belonging to a now-extinct lineage, were contemporaries of the non-avian dinosaurs. While the dominant avialans of the Mesozoic Era, the Enantiornithes, died out with all other non-avian dinosaurs, the Galloanserae (fowl) survived to become the first successful group of modern birds after the other dinosaurs died out.

As opposed to the morphologically fairly conservative Galliformes, the Anseriformes have adapted to filter-feeding and are characterized by many autapomorphies related to this lifestyle. The extremely advanced feeding systems of the Anseriformes, together with similarities of the early anseriform Presbyornis to shorebirds, had formerly prompted some scientists to ally Anseriformes with Charadriiformes, instead. However, as strong support for the Galloanserae has emerged in subsequent studies, the fowl clade continues to be accepted as a genuine evolutionary lineage by the vast majority of scientists.

Relationship with humans

Spiritual meanings and representations
Fowl have deep spiritual meanings and roots in ancient cultures, such as Hinduism in India and in many Pagan cultures throughout the world. The peacock, for example, represents truth, beauty, honor, and strength and dreams of peacocks are referred to as good omens.

As food
Fowl are frequently kept for both meat and eggs. Chickens, by far, are the most heavily consumed and farmed out of all of them. Other fowl commonly used in cooking include ducks, geese and turkeys. Birds such as guineafowl or peafowl are rarely eaten in the West, primarily due to unavailability or high cost.

As game
Various species of fowl are hunted for both sport and food.  Pheasants have been widely introduced and naturalized outside of their native range in Asia to Europe and North America for use as game.

References

Further reading
Benson, D. (1999): Presbyornis isoni and other late Paleocene birds from North Dakota. Smithsonian Contributions to Paleobiology 69: 253–266.
Chubb, A. (2004): New nuclear evidence for the oldest divergence among neognath birds: the phylogenetic utility of ZENK(i). Molecular Phylogenetics and Evolution 30: 140-151
Feduccia, A. (1999): The Origin and Evolution of Birds, Second Edition. Yale University Press, New Haven.
Kriegs, Jan Ole; Matzke, Andreas; Churakov, Gennady; Kuritzin, Andrej; Mayr, Gerald; Brosius, Jürgen & Schmitz, Jürgen (2007): Waves of genomic hitchhikers shed light on the evolution of gamebirds (Aves: Galliformes). BMC Evolutionary Biology 7: 190 (Fulltext).
Kulikova, Irina V.; Drovetski, S.V.; Gibson, D.D.; Harrigan, R.J.; Rohwer, S.; Sorenson, Michael D.; Winker, K.; Zhuravlev, Yury N. & McCracken, Kevin G. (2005): Phylogeography of the Mallard (Anas platyrhynchos): Hybridization, dispersal, and lineage sorting contribute to complex geographic structure. Auk 122 (3): 949–965. [English with Russian abstract] DOI: 10.1642/0004-8038(2005)122[0949:POTMAP]2.0.CO;2 PDF fulltext. Erratum: Auk 122 (4): 1309. DOI: 10.1642/0004-8038(2005)122[0949:POTMAP]2.0.CO;2
Sibley, C.G.; Ahlquist, J.E. & Monroe, B.L. (1988): A classification of the living birds of the world based on DNA-DNA hybridization studies. Auk 105: 409–423.

External links

Extant Maastrichtian first appearances